James Andrew Gipson (born December 21, 1976) is an American politician. He is the current Mississippi Commissioner of Agriculture and Commerce. A member of the Republican Party, Gipson served as a member of the Mississippi House of Representatives from the 77th District from 2008 until his appointment as Agriculture Commissioner in 2018.

Gipson is special counsel in the law firm of Jones Walker LLP's banking and financial services practice group in Jackson.

State Representative 2008-2018 
In the Mississippi House, Gipson has championed bills to allow guns to be carried in more places, such as on university campuses, and to more easily sue government agencies for gun bans or other policies believed to violate gun rights legislation. Gipson's legislation was opposed by state university officials and the Southeastern Conference (SEC), which Gipson suggested  was "evidence of the 'deep state' manipulating and working against the people."

Mississippi Agriculture Commissioner 
On March 30, 2018, Governor Phil Bryant announced that he would appoint Gipson to the office of Mississippi Agriculture and Commerce Commissioner, succeeding Cindy Hyde-Smith, who was appointed by Bryant to serve in the U.S. Senate to fill the vacancy left by Thad Cochran. He was sworn in on April 2 to complete Hyde-Smith's uncompleted term.

2019 General Election
With 845,529 votes cast on the ballot for the Mississippi Commissioner of Agriculture and Commerce Gipson easily defended his seat with a 59% to 41% win. Mississippi has a nearly $9 billion industry in Agriculture and Commerce. In Gipson's acceptance speech he announced his office will focus on workforce development among teens.

References

|-

1976 births
21st-century American lawyers
21st-century American politicians
Living people
Republican Party members of the Mississippi House of Representatives
Mississippi Commissioners of Agriculture and Commerce
People from Flowood, Mississippi